Thomas Augustus Robinson, MBE (March 18, 1937 – November 25, 2012) was a track and field athlete from the Bahamas, who competed in the sprint events. He was born in Nassau, New Providence. Thomas Robinson Stadium (15,000 seats) in the Bahamian capital Nassau, built in 1981, is named after him.

Robinson represented his native country in four consecutive Summer Olympics, starting in 1956, where as an 18 year old, he competed in the 100 metres and 200 metres but did not advance beyond the first round in either event. Four years later in Rome at the 1960 Summer Olympics, Robinson reached the semi-finals in both the 100 metres and the 200 metres; he reached the 100 metres final at the 1964 Summer Olympics and finished in eighth place. At the 1968 Summer Olympics, Robinson was part of the team that reached the semi-finals of the 4 × 100 metres relay, where they were disqualified before the finals.

At the 1958 British Empire and Commonwealth Games in Cardiff, he won gold in the 200 yards dash and silver in the 100 yards dash. He again won silver in the 100 yards in the 1962 British Empire and Commonwealth Games and the 1966 British Empire and Commonwealth Games. He claimed a gold medal at the 1962 Central American and Caribbean Games. Robinson was a contributor on the University of Michigan track team from 1958 to 1961, winning multiple team and individual Big 10 championships during his tenure. He was inducted into the University of Michigan Athletic Hall of Honor in 1985.

Robinson died on November 25, 2012.

References

External links
Tom Robinson's profile at Sports Reference.com

1937 births
2012 deaths
Sportspeople from Nassau, Bahamas
Bahamian male sprinters
Olympic athletes of the Bahamas
Athletes (track and field) at the 1956 Summer Olympics
Athletes (track and field) at the 1960 Summer Olympics
Athletes (track and field) at the 1964 Summer Olympics
Athletes (track and field) at the 1968 Summer Olympics
Michigan Wolverines men's track and field athletes
Athletes (track and field) at the 1958 British Empire and Commonwealth Games
Athletes (track and field) at the 1962 British Empire and Commonwealth Games
Athletes (track and field) at the 1966 British Empire and Commonwealth Games
Athletes (track and field) at the 1970 British Commonwealth Games
Commonwealth Games gold medallists for the Bahamas
Commonwealth Games silver medallists for the Bahamas
Commonwealth Games medallists in athletics
Athletes (track and field) at the 1955 Pan American Games
Athletes (track and field) at the 1967 Pan American Games
Pan American Games competitors for the Bahamas
Members of the Order of the British Empire
Central American and Caribbean Games gold medalists for the Bahamas
Competitors at the 1962 Central American and Caribbean Games
Central American and Caribbean Games medalists in athletics
Medallists at the 1958 British Empire and Commonwealth Games
Medallists at the 1962 British Empire and Commonwealth Games
Medallists at the 1966 British Empire and Commonwealth Games